"Not On Your Love" is a song written by Tony Martin, Troy Martin and Reese Wilson, and recorded by American country music artist Jeff Carson.  It was released in June 1995 as the second single from his self-titled debut album.  The song represents Carson's only Number One single on the Hot Country Singles & Tracks (now Hot Country Songs) chart.

The song's b-side, "Betty's Takin' Judo", was also the b-side to Carson's debut single "Yeah Buddy".

Music video
The music video was directed by Jim Shea, and features Carson in a wall-themed projection world, intercut with scenes of him walking through an old house. Throughout the video, candles are burning, and Carson was standing throughout the whole time. It premiered nationally on CMT in 1995, where it reached number one on CMT's Top 12 Countdown.

Chart positions

Year-end charts

References

1995 singles
1995 songs
Jeff Carson songs
Songs written by Tony Martin (songwriter)
Curb Records singles
Songs written by Reese Wilson